Richard V. Bedesem Sr. (January 22, 1931 – October 6, 1999) was an American football player and coach.  He served as the head football coach at Villanova University from 1975 to 1980 and at Delaware Valley College from 1987 to 1991, compiling a career college football record of 47–67–2.  Bedesem was also an assistant football coach at Temple University and the University of Pittsburgh.  He died of congestive heart failure on October 6, 1999 at Abington Memorial Hospital in Abington, Pennsylvania.

Head coaching record

College

References

1931 births
1999 deaths
Delaware Valley Aggies football coaches
Pittsburgh Panthers football coaches
Temple Owls football coaches
Villanova Wildcats football coaches
Villanova Wildcats football players
High school football coaches in Pennsylvania
People from Springfield Township, Montgomery County, Pennsylvania
Players of American football from Pennsylvania